A by-election for the United Kingdom parliamentary constituency of the City of Chester was held on 1 December 2022, following the appointment of incumbent member of Parliament Chris Matheson as Crown Steward and Bailiff of the Chiltern Hundreds on 21 October 2022 after accusations of sexual misconduct and a recommendation from the Independent Expert Panel that he be suspended from the House of Commons for four weeks.

This was the first by-election to be held during both the reign of King Charles III and the premiership of Rishi Sunak. It was also the first by-election in North West England since the 2017 Copeland by-election, the first in a parliamentary constituency in Cheshire since the 2008 Crewe and Nantwich by-election, and the penultimate by-election of 2022. The by-election was won by Samantha Dixon of the Labour Party. The 14-point swing was Labour's best-ever result in the seat, and the worst result for the Conservative Party in Chester since 1832 (as its precursor, the Tories). The by-election was held two weeks before a by-election in Stretford and Urmston in nearby Greater Manchester.

Background 

The City of Chester constituency is one of the country's oldest, having elected members of parliament since 1545. The constituency is in western Cheshire, alongside Flintshire on the England–Wales border. The constituency covers the cathedral city of the same name and the surrounding rural areas. The constituency varies by social class, including middle-class areas such as Upton-by-Chester and the large rural former council estate of Blacon.

A Conservative safe seat for most of the 20th century, Chester elected its first Labour MP in the 1997 general election, when it was taken by librarian Christine Russell, who defeated TV personality and writer Gyles Brandreth. In 2010, she was unseated by Conservative Stephen Mosley, who served one term. Chris Matheson gained the seat from Mosley with a majority of 93 votes, having the third smallest majority of a parliamentary constituency in the UK in the 2015 general election. At the 2017 election, Matheson increased his majority from 93 to 9,176, turning Chester from a super-marginal seat into a relatively safe seat. Chester voted Remain by 54% to 46% in the 2016 EU referendum.

Matheson resigned on 21 October 2022, in response to the Independent Expert Panel's recommendation that he be suspended from the House of Commons for four weeks over allegations of "serious sexual misconduct" towards a junior member of staff. Following the findings, the Labour Party suspended his membership and withdrew the parliamentary whip. Matheson would have faced a recall from Parliament under the Recall of MPs Act 2015, but he announced his resignation shortly after news of the findings was made public. Matheson continued to deny any sexual misconduct, but said he felt obliged to resign for health and family reasons.

The writ was moved for holding the by-election in the House of Commons on 25 October 2022.

Libraries were made available as drop-off points for postal votes for the by-election until 30 November 2022.

Candidates 
On 29 October, the Conservatives confirmed that Liz Wardlaw, a councillor for Cheshire East Council's Odd Rode ward, would stand as their candidate in the by-election.

On 30 October, the Labour Party confirmed that former Cheshire West and Chester Council leader and current councillor Samantha Dixon would represent them, following a vote by local party members.

On 31 October, the Liberal Democrats announced Rob Herd, a Chester school teacher and parish councillor, as their candidate in the by-election.

Result

Previous result

Reaction 
Leader of the Labour Party Keir Starmer called the result "a clear message to Rishi Sunak". Deputy Leader Angela Rayner spoke to reporters in Chester with Dixon after the result. She said the "historic result" was due to the cost of living crisis. The Conservatives saw their lowest vote share in Chester since the 1832 general election, while Labour saw a 14 point swing towards them from the Conservatives, which, if projected nationally, would see Labour win a general election with a majority government. It was the Labour Party's best-ever result in the seat.

References

External links 

 Candidates announced in City of Chester by-election to replace Christian Matheson. ITV News. Published 30 November 2022.
 Chester by-election candidates' 'minute manifestos'. BBC News. Published 26 November 2022.

2022 elections in the United Kingdom
2022 in England
2020s in Cheshire
By-elections to the Parliament of the United Kingdom in Cheshire constituencies
December 2022 events in the United Kingdom
Politics of Chester